The Kirkland shootings took place in Kirkland and Notre-Dame-de-Grâce, Montreal, Quebec from September 18-20, 2001. The perpetrator, John Bauer, shot and killed six people and set his house on fire before committing suicide.

Shootings
On September 18, at their family home in Kirkland, John Bauer shot his wife with a stolen .22-caliber revolver. Later that day, he shot his three sons in the house. On September 19, Bauer shot his father-in-law at his home in the Notre-Dame-de-Grâce area. On the morning of September 20, he shot and killed his business partner. He then set fire to the house and shot himself. All the victims were shot in the back of the head. The bodies of Bauer's family members were hidden in the house, and the bodies of Bauer and his business partner were found in the kitchen. After the shooting, Bauer's boss revealed that he was also invited to Bauer's home on September 20.

Perpetrator
John Bauer, 51, was a former athlete. At the time of his death, he owed $200,000. He also had debts due to gambling. His eldest son also had debts due to gambling, which he paid for his son. Bauer owed money to his father-in-law and his business partner. On September 20, three of his relatives received death threats by mail.

References

Spree shootings in Canada
2001 murders in Canada
Arson in Canada
Murder in Quebec
Deaths by firearm in Quebec
Family murders
2001 in Quebec